Franklin Shane Burton (born January 18, 1974) is a former American football defensive tackle who played eight seasons in the National Football League (NFL). He was a member of the Miami Dolphins, the Chicago Bears, the New York Jets, and the Carolina Panthers. He played college football at Tennessee.

Born in Logan, West Virginia, Burton grew up in Chapmanville, West Virginia and attended Chapmanville Jr. High School until his family moved to North Carolina during his last year of junior high. He graduated in 1992 from Bandys High School in Catawba, North Carolina.

References

1974 births
Living people
People from Logan, West Virginia
Players of American football from West Virginia
American football defensive backs
Tennessee Volunteers football players
Miami Dolphins players
Chicago Bears players
New York Jets players
Carolina Panthers players
People from Chapmanville, West Virginia